Western Romance languages are one of the two subdivisions of a proposed subdivision of the Romance languages based on the La Spezia–Rimini Line. They include the Gallo-Romance and Iberian Romance branches. Gallo-Italic may also be included. The subdivision is based mainly on the use of the "s" for pluralization, the weakening of some consonants and the pronunciation of “Soft C” as /t͡s/ (often later /s/) rather than /t͡ʃ/ as in Italian and Romanian. 

Based on mutual intelligibility, Dalby counts thirteen languages: Portuguese, Spanish, Asturleonese, Aragonese, Catalan, Gascon, Provençal, Gallo-Wallon, French, Franco-Provençal, Romansh, Ladin and Friulian.

Some classifications include Italo-Dalmatian; the resulting clade is generally called Italo-Western Romance. Other classifications place Italo-Dalmatian with Eastern Romance. 

Sardinian does not fit into either Western or Eastern Romance, and may have split off before either.

Today the four most widely spoken standardized Western Romance languages are Spanish (c. 410 million native speakers, around 125 million second-language speakers), Portuguese (c. 220 million native, another 45 million or so second-language speakers, mainly in Lusophone Africa), French (c. 80 million native speakers, another 70 million or so second-language speakers, mostly in Francophone Africa), and Catalan (c. 7.2 million native). Many of these languages have large numbers of non-native speakers; this is especially the case for French, in widespread use throughout West Africa as a lingua franca.

Gallo-Romance

Gallo-Romance includes: 

The Oïl languages. These include Standard French, Picard, Walloon, Lorrain and Norman.
The Arpitan language, also known as Franco-Provençal. It shares features of both French and the Provençal dialect of Occitan.
The Occitan language, or langue d'oc, has dialects such as Provençal dialect, and Gascon-Aranese dialect.

Gallo-Romance can include:

The Catalan language has standard forms of Catalan and Valencian. Can be classified as East Iberian.
The Rhaeto-Romance languages. They include Romansh of Switzerland, Ladin of the Dolomites area, Friulian of Friuli. Rhaeto-Romance languages can be classified as Gallo-Romance, or as an independent branch of the Western Romance languages.
The Gallo-Italic languages. This group includes languages such as Piedmontese, Ligurian, Lombard, Emilian, Gallo-Italic of Sicily, Gallo-Italic of Basilicata.
The Oïl languages, Arpitan and Rhaeto-Romance languages are sometimes called Gallo-Rhaetian, but it is difficult to exclude from this group Gallo-Italic, which according to several linguists forms a particular unity with Rhaeto-Romance.

Iberian Romance

Iberian Romance languages of the Iberian Peninsula include:
The West Iberian languages:
The Castilian languages: includes Spanish and Judaeo-Spanish.
The Galician-Portuguese languages: includes Portuguese, Galician and Fala. 
The Astur-Leonese languages: they are, from east to west, Cantabrian, central-eastern Asturian and Leonese proper. Going from north to south, they are Leonese proper, Mirandese, Extremaduran and Barranquenho.
The Pyrenean–Mozarabic languages: includes Aragonese, and the extinct Mozarabic. Can be classified as West Iberian.
The East Iberian language, or Catalan language: also classified as part of Occitano-Romance, see Gallo-Romance above.

References